The Kerry Group Irish Novel of the Year Award is an annual award for Irish authors of fiction, established in 1995. It was previously known as the Kerry Ingredients Book of the Year Award (1995–2000), the Kerry Ingredients Irish Fiction Award (2001–2002), and the Kerry Group Irish Fiction Award (2003-2011).

The winner of the prize is announced in May/June each year at the opening ceremony of the Listowel Writers' Week in Kerry.

The prize is sponsored by the food group Kerry Group, and is the largest (currently €20,000) monetary prize for fiction available solely to Irish authors.

Winners and shortlists

Blue Ribbon = winner
1995 Philip Casey – The Fabulists (The Lilliput Press)
1996 Emer Martin – Breakfast in Babylon (Wolfhound Press)
1997 Deirdre Madden – One by One in the Darkness (Faber and Faber)
1998 John Banville – The Untouchable (Picador)
1999 J. M. O'Neill – Bennett & Company (Mount Eagle Publications)
2000 Michael Collins – The Keepers of Truth (Orion Books)
2001 Anne Barnett – The Largest Baby in Ireland After the Famine (Virago)
2002 John McGahern – That They May Face the Rising Sun (Faber and Faber)
2003 William Trevor – The Story of Lucy Gault (Viking)
2004 Gerard Donovan – Schopenhauer's Telescope (Scribner)
2005 Neil Jordan – Shade (John Murray)
2006 Sebastian Barry – A Long Long Way (Viking)
2007 Roddy Doyle – Paula Spencer (Jonathan Cape)
2008 Anne Enright – The Gathering (Jonathan Cape)
2009 Joseph O'Neill – Netherland (Harper Perennial)
2010 John Banville – The Infinities (Picador)
2011 Neil Jordan – Mistaken (John Murray)
2012 Shortlist
 Christine Dwyer Hickey – The Cold Eye of Heaven (Atlantic Books)
Kevin Barry - City Of Bohane
Anne Enright - The Forgotten Waltz
Carlo Gébler - The Dead Eight
Belinda McKeon - Solace
2013 Shortlist
 Gavin Corbett – This Is the Way (4th Estate)
Lucy Caldwell - All The Beggars Riding
Claire Kilroy - The Devil I Know
Kathleen MacMahon - This Is How It Ends
Thomas O'Malley - This Magnificent Desolation
2014 Shortlist
 Eimear McBride – A Girl Is a Half-formed Thing (Galley Beggar Press)
Deirdre Madden - Time Present & Time Past
Colum McCann - Transatlantic
Frank McGuinness - Arimathea
Donal Ryan - The Thing About December
2015 Shortlist
 Eoin McNamee – Blue Is the Night (Faber and Faber)
David Butler - City Of Dis
Nuala Ní Chonchúir - The Closet Of Savage Mementos
Patrick O'Keeffe - The Visitors
Eibhear Walshe - The Diary Of Mary Travers

2016  Shortlist
 Anne Enright – The Green Road (Jonathan Cape)
John Banville - The Blue Guitar
Kevin Barry - Beatlebone
Austin Duffy - This Living And Immortal Thing
Edna O'Brien - The Little Red Chairs
2017 Shortlist
 Kit de Waal – My Name is Leon (Viking)
Emma Donahue - The Wonder
Neil Hegarty - Inch Levels
Mike McCormack - Solar Bones
Conor O'Callaghan - Nothing On Earth
2018 Shortlist
  Paul Lynch – Grace (Oneworld)
Lisa Harding - Harvesting
Frank McGuiness - The Woodcutter And His Family
Bernard McLaverty - Midwinter Break
Sally Rooney - Conversations With Friends
2019 Shortlist
  David Park – Travelling in a Strange Land (Bloomsbury)
John Boyne - Ladder To The Sky
Jess Kidd - The Hoarder
Emer Martin - The Cruelty Men
Sally Rooney - Normal People
2020 Shortlist
  Edna O'Brien – Girl (Faber and Faber)
 Kevin Barry - Nightboat To Tangier
 Mary Costello - The River Capture
 Ronan Hession - Leonard And Hungry Paul
 Joseph O'Connor - Shadowplay
2021 Shortlist
  Anakana Schofield – Bina (Fleet)
 Niamh Campbell - This Happy
 Laura McKenna - Words To Shape My Name
 Adrian Duncan - A Sabbatical In Leipzig
 Rob Doyle - Threshold
2022 Shortlist
  Claire Keegan – Small Things Like These (Grove Press)
 Jan Carson - The Raptures
 Lisa Harding - Bright Burning Things
 Nuala O'Connor - Nora
 Kevin Power - White City

References

External links
Listowel Writers' Week

Irish literary awards
Fiction awards
Awards established in 1995